Nicolas Godin (born 25 December 1969) is a French musician best known for being half of the music duo Air.

Early life
Godin was born in Paris, Île-de-France, France, and studied architecture at the École Nationale Supérieure d'Architecture de Versailles, along with soon to be musical partner, Jean-Benoît Dunckel, a mathematics student.

Before founding Air, Godin played in the band Orange, with others such as Jean-Benoît Dunckel, Alex Gopher, Xavier Jamaux, and Jean de Reydellet. He and Jean-Benoît have been working together since they were teenagers in the 1980s.

Early career
At its outset, Air—a backronym for "Amour, Imagination, Rêve" (love, imagination, dream)—was a one‑person project. Godin, then an architecture student and amateur musician, was asked by a childhood friend to write a song for a compilation to be released by Source, a small French independent label. "Modulor Mix", a tribute to Le Corbusier, was recorded on Godin's Portastudio, and appeared on the Source Lab album in 1995. With several remixes, it was re‑released on British label Mo' Wax in 1996.

Air
Following this small success, Godin asked his friend Jean-Benoît Dunckel, a classically trained pianist, to join him in Air. Together, they produced further 'maxi‑singles' for Source, with titles like "J'ai Dormi Sous L'eau", "Les Professionnels", "Casanova 70" and "Le Soleil Est Près De Moi". Finally, in 1997, Source asked Air to record a whole album. The duo spent several months in a recording studio near Paris called Studio de Saint‑Nom, and asked a friend—freelance engineer and former Plus XXX assistant Stéphane 'Alf' Briat—to work as a sound engineer on that project.

Their full-length debut studio album Moon Safari, released in 1998, was propelled to chart success by the singles "Sexy Boy" "Kelly Watch the Stars" and "All I Need". Its mixture of synths, strings and guitar made it a unique release in the electronica genre at the time. Moon Safari went Platinum in the United Kingdom and Gold in France.

Solo projects
On 18 September 2015 Godin released his first solo album Contrepoint (Because Music), inspired by the music of Johann Sebastian Bach. Godin composed the soundtrack for French series A Very Secret Service (2015–2018). Godin released his second studio album Concrete and Glass on 24 January 2020 via Because Music.

Discography

Albums

References

External links
2010 Nicolas Godin interview on RocknRollDating

1969 births
Living people
French male singers
French pop guitarists
French male guitarists
French keyboardists
Virgin Records artists
Chevaliers of the Ordre des Arts et des Lettres
People from Le Chesnay
Because Music artists